The Belle Plaine Community School District, is a rural, public school district in Belle Plaine, Iowa.  The district covers southwest Benton County, eastern Tama County, and smaller portions of Iowa and Powesheik counties.  It serves the towns of Belle Plaine and Luzerne.

The school's mascot is the Plainsman. Their colors are gold and blue. They compete in the South Iowa Cedar League (SICL) conference.

Schools
Longfellow Elementary School
Belle Plaine Jr./Sr. High School
The administrative offices are located at Longfellow Elementary School

Belle Plaine Jr./Sr. High School
The Belle Plaine Jr./Sr. High School is the local public high school in Belle Plaine.

Athletics
The Plainsmen compete in the South Iowa Cedar League Conference in the following sports:

Cross Country (boys and girls)
Volleyball (girls)
Football (boys)
Basketball (boys and girls)
Wrestling (boys and girls)
Boys' State Champions - 1976, 2001
Track and Field (boys and girls)
Boys' State Champions- 1969, 1971
Girls' State Champions - 1964, 1965, 1966, 1984, 1998 
Golf (boys and girls)
Boys' State Champions - 2002
Baseball (boys)
Softball (girls)

Enrollment

References

External links
 Belle Plaine Community School

Education in Benton County, Iowa
Education in Iowa County, Iowa
Education in Poweshiek County, Iowa
Education in Tama County, Iowa
School districts in Iowa